Washington Park is a village in St. Clair County, Illinois, United States. The population was 4,196 as of the 2010 census, down from 5,345 in 2000.

History

Washington Park filed for Chapter 9 bankruptcy protection in July 2009, citing assets of less than $50,000 and debt of more than $1 million. U.S. Bankruptcy Judge Pamela Pepper threw out the filing in December 2010 after finding there was no state law enabling a municipality to declare bankruptcy. Washington Park filed for bankruptcy in 2004 as well, claiming a $1.6 million debt, but that filing was dismissed when the village briefly emerged from insolvency.

In 2010, the mayor of Washington Park, John Thornton, was found to have been fatally shot; he was discovered in his car injured on the morning of April 1, and died at a hospital at 6 AM.

On July 25, 2012 the chief of police called for the disbanding of the police force.

Geography
Washington Park is located at  (38.629750, -90.094606).

The city is served by Washington Park station on the St. Louis MetroLink light rail system.

Demographics

2020 census

As of the census of 2000, there were 5,345 people, 1,692 households, and 1,218 families residing in the village. The racial makeup of the village was 6.06% White, 91.94% African American, 0.15% Native American, 0.13% Asian, 0.75% from other races, and 0.97% from two or more races. Hispanic or Latino of any race were 1.89% of the population.

There were 1,692 households, out of which 40.4% had children under the age of 18 living with them, 27.0% were married couples living together, 38.2% had a female householder with no husband present, and 28.0% were non-families. 23.1% of all households were made up of individuals, and 6.1% had someone living alone who was 65 years of age or older. The average household size was 3.15 and the average family size was 3.77.

In the village, the population was spread out, with 37.0% under the age of 18, 10.8% from 18 to 24, 25.2% from 25 to 44, 20.2% from 45 to 64, and 6.8% who were 65 years of age or older. The median age was 27 years. For every 100 females, there were 83.1 males. For every 100 women age 18 and over, there were 78.7 men.

The median income for a household in the village was $21,132, and the median income for a family was $23,266. Males had a median income of $30,924 versus $20,463 for females. The per capita income for the village was $8,495. About 42.6% of families and 44.8% of the population were below the poverty line, including 54.9% of those under age 18 and 33.9% of those age 65 or over.

Education
Washington Park is a part of the East St. Louis School District. Avant Elementary School is located in Washington Park.

Manners Elementary School and Woodrow Wilson Elementary School were formerly located in Washington Park. Wilson opened in 1927. In July 2004 the district CEO, Stan Mims, toured Wilson and then determined that the school needed to be closed; the school closed in fall 2004  and students were transferred to three other elementary schools in the area, including Hawthorne, Nelson Mandela, and Manners.

References

Villages in St. Clair County, Illinois
Villages in Illinois
Government units that have filed for Chapter 9 bankruptcy